This is a list of law enforcement agencies in the state of West Virginia.

According to the US Bureau of Justice Statistics' 2008 Census of State and Local Law Enforcement Agencies, the state had 233 law enforcement agencies employing 3,382 sworn police officers, about 186 for each 100,000 residents.

State agencies 
 Hatfield-McCoy Recreation Area Park Rangers 
 West Virginia Alcohol Beverage Control Administration
 West Virginia Division of Forestry Special Operations and Enforcement Division 
 West Virginia Division of Natural Resources Law Enforcement Section (Natural Resources Police)
 West Virginia Division of Protective Services
 West Virginia Public Service Commission Motor Carrier Enforcement
 West Virginia State Fire Marshal's Office
 West Virginia State Police
 West Virginia Military Authority - Camp Dawson Security

State Correctional agencies 
 West Virginia Division of Corrections and Rehabilitation
 West Virginia Division of Juvenile Services (defunct)
  West Virginia Regional Jail Authority (defunct)

County agencies 

 Barbour County Sheriff's Office
 Berkeley County Sheriff's Office
 Boone County Sheriff's Office
 Braxton County Sheriff's Office
 Brooke County Sheriff's Office
 Cabell County Sheriff's Office 
 Calhoun County Sheriff's Office
 Clay County Sheriff's Office
 Doddridge County Sheriff's Office
 Fayette County Sheriff's Office
 Gilmer County Sheriff's Office
 Grant County Sheriff's Office
 Greenbrier County Sheriff's Office
 Hampshire County Sheriff's Office
 Hancock County Sheriff's Office
 Hardy County Sheriff's Department 
 Harrison County Sheriff's Department
 Jackson County Sheriff's Department
 Jefferson County Sheriff's Department
 Kanawha County Sheriff's Department
 Lewis County Sheriff's Department
 Lincoln County Sheriff's Department
 Logan County Sheriff's Department
 Marion County Sheriff's Department
 Marshall County Sheriff's Department 
 Mason County Sheriff's Department
 McDowell County Sheriff's Department
 Mercer County Sheriff's Department
 Mineral County Sheriff's Department
 Mingo County Sheriff's Department 
 Monongalia County Sheriff's Department
 Monroe County Sheriff's Department
 Morgan County Sheriff's Department 
 Nicholas County Sheriff's Department 
 Ohio County Sheriff's Department
 Pendleton County Sheriff's Department
 Pleasants County Sheriff's Department 
 Pocahontas County Sheriff's Department 
 Preston County Sheriff's Department
 Putnam County Sheriff's Department
 Raleigh County Sheriff's Department
 Randolph County Sheriff's Department
 Ritchie County Sheriff's Department 
 Roane County Sheriff's Department 
 Summers County Sheriff's Department
 Taylor County Sheriff's Department 
 Tucker County Sheriff's Department
 Tyler County Sheriff's Department 
 Upshur County Sheriff's Department
 Wayne County Sheriff's Department
 Webster County Sheriff's Department 
 Wetzel County Sheriff's Office
 Wirt County Sheriff's Office
 Wood County Sheriff's Office
 Wyoming County Sheriff's Office

Municipal agencies 

 Alderson Police Department
 Anmoore Police Department
 Ansted Police Department
 Athens Police Department
 Barboursville Police Department
 Barrackville Police Department 
 Beckley Police Department
 Beech Bottom Police Department
 Bellington Police Department
 Belle Police Department
 Benwood Police Department
 Berkeley Springs/Town of Bath Police Department
 Bethlehem Police Department
 Bluefield Police Department
 Bradshaw Police Department
 Bramwell Police Department
 Bridgeport Police Department
 Buckhannon Police Department
 Buffalo Police Department
 Cameron Police Department
 Capon Bridge Police Department
 Cedar Grove Police Department
 Ceredo Police Department
 Chapmanville Police Department
 Charles Town Police Department
 Charleston Police Department
 Chesapeake Police Department 
 Chester Police Department
 Clarksburg Police Department
 Clendenin Police Department
 Cowen Police Department
 Danville Police Department
 Davis Police Department (defunct)
 Delbarton Police Department
 Dunbar Police Department
 East Bank Police Department
 Eleanor Police Department
 Elk Gardens Police Department 
 Elkins Police Department
 Fairmont Police Department
 Farmington Police Department
 Fayetteville Police Department
 Fort Gay Police Department
 Follansbee Police Department
 Gary Police Department
 Gassaway Police Department 
 Gauley Bridge Police Department
 Gilbert Police Department
 Glasgow Police Department
 Glenville Police Department
 Grafton Police Department 
 Grant Town Police Department
 Grantsville Police Department
 Granville Police Department
 Hamlin Police Department
 Handley Police Department 
 Harpers Ferry Police Department
 Harrisville Police Department
 Hinton Police Department
 Huntington Police Department
 Hurricane Police Department
 Kenova Police Department
 Kermit Police Department
 Keyser Police Department
 Keystone Police Department
 Kingwood Police Department
 Lewisburg Police Department
 Logan Police Department 
 Lumberport Police Department 
 Mabscott Police Department
 Madison Police Department
 Man Police Department
 Mannington Police Department
 Marlinton Police Department
 Marmet Police Department
 Martinsburg Police Department
 Mason Police Department
 Masontown Police Department
 McMechen Police Department
 Milton Police Department
 Monongah Police Department 
 Montgomery Police Department 
 Moorefield Police Department
 Morgantown Police Department
 Moundsville Police Department
 Mt. Hope Police Department
 Mullens Police Department
 New Cumberland Police Department
 New Haven Police Department
 New Martinsville Police Department 
 Nitro Police Department
 Nutter Fort Police Department
 Oak Hill Police Department
 Oceana Police Department
 Paden City Police Department
 Parkersburg Police Department
 Parsons Police Department
Paw Paw Police Department
 Pennsboro Police Department
 Petersburg Police Department
 Philippi Police Department
 Piedmont Police Department
 Pineville Police Department
 Poca Police Department
 Point Pleasant Police Department
 Pratt Police Department
 Princeton Police Department
 Rainelle Police Department
 Ranson Police Department
 Ravenswood Police Department
 Richwood Police Department 
 Ridgeley Police Department
 Ripley Police Department 
 Romney Police Department
 Ronceverte Police Department
 Rowelsburg Police Department
 Salem Police Department 
 Shepherdstown Police Department
 Shinston Police Department
 Sistersville Police Department
 Smithers Police Department
 Sophia Police Department
 South Charleston Police Department
 Spencer Police Department
 St. Albans Police Department
 St. Marys Police Department 
 Star City Police Department
 Stonewood Police Department
 Summersville Police Department
 Sutton Police Department
 Terra Alta Police Department 
 Town of West Logan Police Department
 Tridelphia Police Department
 Valley Grove Police Department
 Vienna Police Department
 War Police Department 
 Wardensville Police Department
 Wayne Police Department
 Webster Springs Police Department 
 Weirton Police Department
 Welch Police Department
 Wellsburg Police Department
 Town of West Liberty Police Department
 West Union Police Department
 Weston Police Department
 Westover Police Department
 Wheeling Police Department
 White Sulphur Springs Police Department
 Whitesville Police Department
 Williamson Police Department
 Williamstown Police Department
 Winfield Police Department

College and university agencies 

 Bluefield State College Department of Public Safety
 Concord University Police Department
 Fairmont State University Police Department
 Glenville State College Department of Public Safety
 Marshall University Police Department
 Potomac State College Police Department
 Shepherd University Police Department
 West Liberty University Police Department
 West Virginia University Police Department
 West Virginia University Institute of Technology Police Department
 West Virginia State University Department of Public Safety
 University of Charleston Department of Public Safety

References

West Virginia
Law enforcement agencies of West Virginia
Law enforcement agencies